The Chief Minister of Meghalaya is the chief executive of the Indian state of Meghalaya. As per the Constitution of India, the governor is a state's de jure head, but de facto executive authority rests with the chief minister. Following elections to the Meghalaya Legislative Assembly, the state's governor usually invites the party (or coalition) with a majority of seats to form the government. The governor appoints the chief minister, whose council of ministers are collectively responsible to the assembly. Given that he has the confidence of the assembly, the chief minister's term is for five years and is subject to no term limits.

Since 1970, twelve people have served as Chief Minister of Meghalaya. Six of these belonged to the Indian National Congress, including the inaugural officeholder Williamson A. Sangma. The current incumbent is Conrad Sangma of the National People's Party since 6 March 2018.

List

See also
 Government of Meghalaya
 Chief Ministers of India

Notes
Footnotes

References

External links
 Meghalaya Legislative Assembly

 
Meghalaya
Chief Ministers